This is the fifth edition of Copa Bolivia. Defending champions were Oriente Petrolero for the second time.

Qualifying round

Play-off round

Group stage
Group A

Standings

Results

Group B

Standings

Results

Semi-final

Final

Bol
Bol